Gedocarnil (INN) is an anxiolytic of the β-carboline class related to abecarnil. It is registered as an anxiolytic under the WHO's ATC classification system; however, there are no trade names associated with it and it does not appear to have ever been marketed.

See also
 Nonbenzodiazepine

References

Anxiolytics
Beta-Carbolines
Chloroarenes
Carboxylate esters
Ethers
Phenol ethers
GABAA receptor positive allosteric modulators